Southampton Football Club is an English association football club based in Southampton, Hampshire. Founded in 1885 as St Mary's YMA, they became a professional club in 1891, and co-founded the Southern League in 1894. Southampton won the Southern League championship six times between 1896 and 1904, and were later elected to the Football League in 1920 as co-founders of the Third Division. The Saints finished as runners-up in their first season, and the following year received promotion to the Second Division as Third Division South champions. The club first entered the First Division in 1966, and currently play in its modern-day counterpart, the Premier League. Southampton won the FA Cup in 1976, reached the final of the League Cup in 1979 and 2017, and won the League Trophy in 2010.

The Southampton Player of the Season award is voted for annually by the club's supporters, who send their choice of player to the Southern Daily Echo, a local newspaper. Since its inception in 1973, 41 different players have won the award. Six of these players have received the accolade for a second time, and to date only Matt Le Tissier has won the award for a third time. Three players have won in consecutive seasons, 29 winners have represented their country at international level, and one winner (Alan Ball) has gone on to become the club's manager. The most recent winner of the award, for the 2020–21 season, is midfielder James Ward-Prowse.

In recent years, the club has also presented its own Player of the Season award, alongside other end-of-season accolades. The most recent winner of the club-run Fans' Player of the Season award is Ward-Prowse, who was also named Players' Player of the Season. Danny Ings won Goal of the Season, Nathan Tella won Young Player of the Season, and Stuart Armstrong received the President's Choice Award. In the Southampton Academy, Will Tizzard won Scholar of the Year. For Southampton Women, Ella Pusey was named Fans' Player of the Season, Kayla Rendell won Players' Player of the Season, Rachel Panting won Goal of the Season, and Sara Luce received the Southampton Way Award. For the Girls' Regional Talent Club, Ellie Head won Player of the Season.

Table key

Winners

Southern Daily Echo award

Southampton F.C. award

Footnotes

References

Bibliography

External links
Southampton F.C. official website

Player of the Season
Association football player of the year awards by club in England
Association football player non-biographical articles